The Ups and Downs is the debut album by the English singer/songwriter Stephen Duffy (released under the name Stephen "Tin Tin" Duffy). It was released in April 1985 and reached No. 35 on the UK Albums Chart.

It includes the UK No. 4 single, "Kiss Me", a solo re-recording of a song originally recorded with his earlier band, Tin Tin. A second single from the album, "The Icing on the Cake" reached #14 in the UK. Although further singles from the album were released, none charted within the top 75.

During a 2008 interview to promote its expanded CD reissue, Duffy commented that "I never liked The Ups and Downs. I enjoyed mixing with Stephen Street and making 'The Icing on the Cake' but the rest of it is just a mess."

Track listing
All tracks composed by Stephen Duffy; except where noted.

Personnel
Stephen "Tin Tin" Duffy - vocals
Guy Pratt,  Eluriel "Tinker" Barfield, David Levy - bass
Andy Richards, Danny Schogger - keyboards
Charley Charles - drums
Toni Childs - vocals on "Kiss Me"
Booker T. Jones - piano on "Wednesday Jones"
Leroy Williams - percussion on "Icing on the Cake"
Roger Freeman - trombone
Chris Dean, Steve Sidwell - brass on "The World at Large Alone"
Robert "Joad" Gannon, Jane Eugene, Julie Roberts, Gary Osborne - backing vocals
Nicky Holland - string arrangement

References 

Stephen Duffy albums
1985 debut albums
Albums produced by Stephen Street
Albums produced by Booker T. Jones